Marcy Hill is a summit located in Central New York Region of New York located in the Town of Marcy. Located in Oneida County, north of Utica.

References

Mountains of Oneida County, New York
Mountains of New York (state)